Charles Joseph Panarella a.k.a. "Charlie Moose" a.k.a.  "Len Conforti" a.k.a.  "Chas Esposito" (January 5, 1925 – July 18, 2017) was a New York City mobster and capo in the Colombo crime family with a brutal reputation as a hitman.

Early years

Charles was born in 1925 in Brooklyn, New York. He is also known to use January 5, 1922 as his birth date. He has used the aliases Charles Panarello, Chas Esposito, John Garguilo, Joseph Charles Panarella and Charles "Moose" Panarella. In 1940, Panarella was arrested for the first time. His criminal record includes assault, burglary, extortion and possession of a loaded firearm.

On August 11, 1972, Albert Gallo, brother of the late rogue Profaci crime family capo Crazy Joe Gallo (killed on April 7, 1972), had pinpointed Joseph (The Yack) Yacovelli, Alphonse (Allie the Snake) Persico Sr., Gennaro Langella and at least one other Colombo hood (thought to be Panarella) at the bar of the Neapolitan Noodle located at 320 East 79th Street in Midtown Manhattan. Minutes before the hit men arrived, however, the mobsters had moved to another table. In their place were five meat dealers from Chicago with their wives celebrating the engagement of one of their daughters to the restaurant's manager. As this party moved to a table, led by the wives, the shooter, dressed in casual clothes and wearing dark glasses and a long black shoulder length wig, opened up with two guns killing Sheldon Epstein and Max Tekelch and wounding two other men. The killer escaped and was never found. The public outrage was led by New York City Mayor John V. Lindsay, who promised in running the gangsters out of town. Panarella was unharmed. Panarella once allegedly forced a man to eat his own testicles before killing him.   Panarella has survived several feuds within the Colombo family that killed more than 100 people.

While in New York, Panarella had a large profitable crew that included Gregory Scarpa Sr. The crew trafficked in narcotics, robbed banks, and controlled sheet metal and restaurant unions.

Exile to Las Vegas

In the mid-1980s, Panarella's crew complained to Colombo boss Carmine Persico that Panarella was an abusive capo, however, the complainants were just fearful of Charlie Moose who was from the old school and didn't put up with people in the crew who tried to avoid kicking up. His crew included some of the biggest killers in the family who were more than willing to put in any work that was passed down through Moose from the imprisoned Persico. Facing federal indictment, Persico feared that Panarella and caporegime John "Sonny" Franzese might use his legal troubles to move against him. When Panarella's crew continued to complain that Moose was too demanding it gave Persico an excuse to exile Panarella to Las Vegas. Of all the people in his family, Persico feared Moose the most, then Sonny. It was legendary that Charlie had tortured and killed powerful Capo Dominic "Mimi" Scialo as a favor to Carlo Gambino after Scialo mocked Gambino to his face at Gargiulo's Restaurant in Coney Island.  Panarella would not forget this slight from Persico sending him to Vegas after being called upon by Persico dozens of times to kill for even the slightest of reasons even returning from Vegas occasionally to put work in that was ordered by his boss. In 1991, he actively sided with Victor Orena against Persico during Orena's failed effort to take over the Colombo family but nobody, not even Greg Scarpa Sr. would try to kill the wily Moose. Panarella although siding with Orena mostly stayed out of the 3rd Colombo war but was called upon to kill an associate James "Jimmy Beans" Brunetto after Brunetto was found to have molested a 9-year-old boy in the back of R and J Health Studio a gym on Ave U. The boy was the grandson of Little Vic. Brunetto was kidnapped by a group of men after he left a bowling alley in the Mill Basin section of Brooklyn and his body has never been recovered. It is rumored that Brunetto was taken to a Sheepshead Bay Garage and that he had his penis removed and shoved up his rectum. He was supposed to be left that way on a street as a warning but because there had been a possible witness to the abduction they melted his body by acid in a 55-gallon drum, filled it with cement, and dropped it into Mill Basin from the Palone Boatyard on Ave U and East 67 Street.

In 1994, Panarella was convicted of attempting to launder money through the Maxim Casino (now called the Westin Las Vegas) in Las Vegas as part of a scheme to purchase a farm for $500,000 to $1 million. Panarella had drug profits deposited at a cashier's cage at the casino.  In August 1994, Panarella pleaded guilty to conspiracy and served 15 months of an 18-month sentence. In September 1996, Panarella was released from prison.

Back to New York

Although living in Las Vegas, Panarella still kept some responsibilities back East.  For a period of time, he was shuttling back to Brooklyn to oversee the Colombo family's interests in Locals 14 and 15 of the International Union of Operating Engineers.

In the summer of 2001, Panarella met in New York with Genovese family representatives over a dispute in Brooklyn. The Genovese family controlled most of the so-called "no-show" construction jobs in Brooklyn and the Colombo family wanted their fair share of them. Unfortunately for Panarella, the meeting location was bugged and law enforcement picked up clear evidence that he was acting as a member of the Colombo family.

On December 4, 2003, Panarella was indicted in New York on a federal racketeering charge in connection with alleged labor law violations and construction payoffs.  The charges were linked to alleged payoffs within Locals 14 and 15 of the International Union of Operating Engineers and to fraud in the construction of Richmond County Bank Ballpark, home of the Staten Island Yankees baseball team, and in construction of the Brooklyn General Post Office.

In February 2008, Panarella was living under house arrest at his home in Kunkletown, Pennsylvania. The trial based on his 2005 racketeering indictment had been delayed due to Panarella's ill health and psychological problems.

In December 2012, a federal judge granted Panarella permission to travel to Long Island City, Queens in April 2013 to receive an award from his former union. It was reported that Panarella was confined to a motorized scooter and depended on portable oxygen. On July 26, 2019, the Las Vegas Review-Journal reported that the Nevada Gaming Commission had removed Panarella's name from its Black Book in a unanimous vote after the attorney general's office submitted Panarella's death certificate which revealed that he had died on July 18, 2017. “Because Mr. Panarella is deceased, he no longer poses a threat to the Nevada gaming industry, so therefore the (state Gaming Control) Board respectfully requests his removal,” Deputy Attorney General Tiffany Breinig said in remarks to the commission.

References

 

1925 births
2017 deaths
American gangsters of Italian descent
Colombo crime family
Mafia hitmen